Frymburk (1951–1991 Želenov) is a municipality and village in Klatovy District in the Plzeň Region of the Czech Republic. It has about 100 inhabitants.

Administrative parts

The village of Damětice is an administrative part of Frymburk.

References

Villages in Klatovy District